Comanca may refer to several villages in Romania:

 Comanca, a village in Deveselu Commune, Olt County
 Comanca, a village in the town of Băile Olăneşti, Vâlcea County
 Comanca, a tributary of the river Olănești in Vâlcea County

See also 
 Coman (disambiguation)
 Comana (disambiguation)
 Comănești (disambiguation)